The Mega Kid MK-1000 is a Nintendo Entertainment System hardware clone with a built-in Famicom BASIC compatible keyboard, marketed as an "educational computer".

The system comes with two black PlayStation look-alike controllers and a black NES Zapper clone resembling a submachine gun. All are connected with 9-pin DB connectors, as found on most Famiclones.

It has a composite video output and a mono audio output, as well as a rather crude RF modulator antenna output, unfiltered (the output appears on several TV channels) and unshielded from interferences.

In its box is contained a Famicom cartridge containing several NES applications that work with the keyboard, such as crude word processors, keyboard exercises, mathematical games, G-BASIC and a handful of first generation NES games such as F-1 Race, Track & Field and "Jewel Tetris".

This cartridge also contains an additional 64 K static RAM chip, mainly for use with the provided G-BASIC, a dialect of the BASIC programming language designed for the NES. However, no CMOS backup memory is provided, so any typed-in program or text will be lost upon rebooting or switching the power off.

It works with standard Famicom cartridges, as well as US NES cartridges with the use of an adaptor.

References

Unlicensed Nintendo Entertainment System hardware clones